Larong may refer to:

 Ardy Larong (born 1980), Filipino basketball player
 Larong language, spoken in Tibet